Andrea Lenzi (born 29 June 1988) is an Italian coxswain. He won a gold medal at the 2006 World Rowing Championships in Dorney with the lightweight men's eight.

References

1988 births
Living people
Italian male rowers
World Rowing Championships medalists for Italy
Coxswains (rowing)